Margaret Hunt (née Raine; 1831–1912) was a British novelist<ref>{{cite book|author=John Sutherland|author-link=John Sutherland (author)|url=https://books.google.com/books?id=QzJ3yNVVqtUC&pg=PA314|chapter=Hunt, ... [Margaret]|page=314|title=The Stanford Companion to Victorian Literature|origyear=1989|year=1990|isbn=9780804718424}}</ref> and translator of the tales of the Brothers Grimm.

Life
Margaret Raine, was born in Durham, England, 1831. She was the daughter of James Raine and sister to James Raine the younger, she also wrote under the pseudonym Averil Beaumont. Her husband was the artist Alfred William Hunt. Her older daughter was the novelist Violet Hunt; her younger daughter Venetia married the designer William Arthur Smith Benson (1854–1924).

In the 1880s, a family friendship with Oscar Wilde was developed through her literary connections. In 1886, she was living in London. In addition to writing her novels, she translated a definitive edition of Grimm's Fairy Tales.

Hunt's grave and those of her husband and daughter are in Plot 56 at Brookwood Cemetery.

 Works 

The following list is a selection of novels written by Hunt,
 Under Seal of Confession (1874) (as Averil Beaumont)
 The Leaden Casket (1880)
 Thornicroft's Model (1881) (as Averil Beaumont)
 The Governess (1912) with Violet Hunt, preface by Ford Madox Brown.

In 1884 she produced the two volume Grimm's Household Tales'' (Bell & Sons, Covent Garden), with an introduction by Andrew Lang.

References

External links

 
 
 
 
 Golden Gale (most of her novels)

British women novelists
1831 births
1912 deaths
German–English translators
19th-century British translators
19th-century British novelists
20th-century British novelists
20th-century British women writers
Burials at Brookwood Cemetery
20th-century British translators
19th-century British women writers
19th-century British writers
Pseudonymous women writers
People from Durham, England
19th-century pseudonymous writers
20th-century pseudonymous writers